John Brooks (baptized May 4, 1752 – March 1, 1825) was an American doctor, military officer, and politician from Massachusetts.  He served as the 11th Governor of Massachusetts from 1816 to 1823, and was one of the last Federalist officials elected in the United States.

Trained as a doctor, Brooks was an officer of the Reading, Massachusetts militia when the American Revolutionary War broke out, and led his troops in the Battles of Lexington and Concord.  He served under George Washington in the New York and New Jersey campaign of 1776, although he missed the Battle of Trenton due to illness.  In 1777 he was part of the relief force for the Siege of Fort Stanwix, and led a successful assault against British positions in the key Second Battle of Saratoga.  He played a significant role in the 1783 Newburgh Conspiracy, in which he helped quash ideas of mutiny in the Continental Army.

After the war he returned to medical practice, but continued to be active in the state militia, helping to put down Shays' Rebellion in 1787.  He served in the militia during the War of 1812, after which he was elected governor.  Brooks was popular and politically moderate, and came to personify the "Era of Good Feelings" that followed the war.  He retired in 1823, and died two years later.

Early years 
John Brooks was born in Medford, the son of Caleb and Ruth Albree Brooks, who were local farmers, and was baptized on May 4, 1752.  After education in the local schools, Brooks studied medicine with Dr. Simon Tufts alongside Benjamin Thompson.  In his free time he engage in military drills with other local boys and carefully watched the maneuvers of British Army troops stationed in nearby Boston.  When his apprenticeship with Dr. Tufts ended Brooks established a medical practice in Reading, where he was active in the local militia.

Revolutionary War service 
When Paul Revere gave the alarm that sparked the Battles of Lexington and Concord on April 19, 1775, Brooks, then 22 and a major in the Reading militia, marched with his unit in response.  His troops were among the first to reach Concord as the British took the road back to Boston, and are credited with beginning the running battle that took place.  Brooks later described that day as the most difficult of his life.  He then joined the Continental Army in May 1775 as a major in Bridge's Regiment, and was among the troops sent to fortify Breed's Hill on the night of June 16–17.  He missed the next day's Battle of Bunker Hill, because he was sent by Colonel William Prescott to request reinforcements.  He continued to serve in the Siege of Boston, transferring to the 19th Continental Regiment on January 1, 1776.  One of Brooks' subordinates in this unit was William Hull, with whom he formed a fast friendship.  After the British withdrawal from Boston, Brooks' regiment next saw action in the October 1776 Battle of White Plains, and was in General George Washington's retreat across New Jersey afterward.  Brooks was ill in camp when the army engaged in the Battle of Trenton on December 26.  On November 1, 1776 he transferred to the 8th Massachusetts Regiment, where he was promoted to lieutenant colonel.

The 8th Massachusetts was among the forces Benedict Arnold led in relief of the Siege of Fort Stanwix in upstate New York, and was present at the Battles of Saratoga.  In the second battle on October 7, 1777, Brooks gained a reputation for fearlessness in the assault and capture of Hessian fortifications on the British right.  In the winter of 1777–78 Brooks was at Valley Forge, where he served as a leading drill master under Baron von Steuben.  In a letter to a friend Brooks describes the harsh conditions of the camp at Valley Forge, as he mentions the “poor brave fellows” that were living in tents “bare-footed, bare-legged, bare-breeched”.

Brooks was temporarily named adjutant to General Charles Lee when the army followed the British across New Jersey in 1778, engaging them in the Battle of Monmouth.  He was transferred to the 7th Massachusetts in November 1778, and was its lieutenant-colonel commandant until June 12, 1783 when he resigned.  His regiment was involved in garrison duty in New England and the New York City area until the end of his service.

Brooks was a Freemason and in 1781 was elected master of Washington Lodge under the Grand Lodge of Massachusetts.  Washington Lodge was a "Travelling Lodge" which travelled with the Continental Army.

In 1783 Brooks played a prominent role in events concerning army pay arrears and pensions that became known as the Newburgh Conspiracy.  He was one of three officers who delivered to the Continental Congress a letter drafted by discontented officers, and participated in hearings in which the army delegation outlined serious issues among the officers at Newburgh, New York.  He then carried letters back to the army headquarters, and took part in actions orchestrated by Washington supporters to put down any ideas of mutiny.  He was accused, apparently falsely, of informing Washington of the conspiracy (Washington was tipped off by Alexander Hamilton to anticipate unrest.)  Historian Richard Kohn writes that details are lacking of Brooks' actions and motivations in the critical days of the conspiracy in February and March 1783, but describes his role in the affair as "crucial".

In 1783 Brooks was admitted as an original member of The Society of the Cincinnati in the state of Massachusetts and served as that constituent society's first secretary from 1783 to 1786. In 1810 he was elected president of the Massachusetts Society and in 1811 he was elected vice president of the national society.  He served both offices until his death in 1825.

Post-Revolution and War of 1812 

After the war Brooks returned to medical practice, taking over the office of Dr. Tufts in Medford.  He was the first member elected to the Ancient and Honorable Artillery Company when it was revived after the Revolution in 1786.

In the militia he rose to the position of major general in command of the Middlesex Division.  He commanded the division under Major General Benjamin Lincoln when the Massachusetts Militia put down Shays' Rebellion in 1787.   That same year, he was elected to a one-year term as captain of the Ancient and Honorable Artillery Company.  He was elected to the state convention that ratified the United States Constitution in 1788.

In 1792 Secretary at War Henry Knox offered Brooks a position as brigadier general in the Legion of the United States, a reorganization of the United States Army headed by General Anthony Wayne.  Brooks refused the appointment, which went instead to his friend William Hull.  He was elected to a second one-year term as captain of the Ancient and Honorable Artillery Company in 1794.

He was offered a position as brigadier general in the United States Army by George Washington when war was threatened with France in 1797, but refused.  During the War of 1812 Brooks was the state militia's adjutant general with the rank of major general.

Governor of Massachusetts 
Brooks, politically a Federalist, served in the state legislature for a number of years.  In 1816 Governor Caleb Strong announced his retirement.  The Federalist caucus first chose Harrison Gray Otis as its candidate, but he categorically refused the nomination.  The nomination was next offered to Lieutenant Governor William Phillips, Jr., but he also turned the nomination down because he was not the first choice.  The caucus then cast about for other candidates; Brooks was proposed by House Speaker Timothy Bigelow.  He also initially refused the nomination, but was convinced by a committee from the caucus to accept, and won the election.  He won reelection annually until 1823, when he retired from public service.

The politics of the state was dominated by Federalists, despite their general decline elsewhere in the nation, in part because Brooks adopted moderate positions that denied the opposition Democratic-Republicans opportunities for vigorous opposition.  He included Republicans in patronage appointments, courted Republican politicians on the national level, including President James Monroe, and minimized his association with the Federalist leadership in Massachusetts.  Historian Ronald Formisano writes that Brooks "came to personify the non-partisan Era of Good Feelings in Massachusetts."

The Panic of 1819 and the granting of statehood to Maine (which was until 1820 part of Massachusetts) introduced fractures in the strong Federalist party system in the state.  Dissident Federalists such as Josiah Quincy III joined Republicans in calls for a constitutional convention, citing the state constitution's requirement that Maine be allocated representation in the legislature as a reason.  Brooks lobbied against the idea, arguing that the legislature could draft proposed amendments, but a convention was held despite his efforts.  Nine amendments produced by the convention were eventually approved, but Federalist leaders managed to block most of the substantive reforms that had been sought.  One of the consequences of the panic was the rise, particularly in Boston, of a political faction known as the "Middling Interest".  This group was composed of primarily working class men who were unhappy with the state party's elitist leadership.  Led by Josiah Quincy, the split would eventually lead to the final collapse of Federalism in the state.

Brooks announced in 1822 that he would not seek reelection in 1823.  The 1823 election saw the victory of Republican William Eustis over Federalist party leader Harrison Gray Otis.  Otis almost did not carry Boston, and lost other Federalist strongholds in the state.

Brooks was a leading member of the Massachusetts Medical Society for many years, serving as its president after his retirement from politics, and was also president of the Bible Society of Massachusetts.  He was also president of the Society of the Cincinnati for many years, and was involved in the Washington Monument Association and the Bunker Hill Monument Association.

Governor Brooks died in Medford on March 1, 1825, and was buried in Medford's Salem Street Burying Ground, where the family grave is marked by a large obelisk erected in his honor.

Family and legacy 
In 1774 Brooks married Lucy Smith, with whom he had five children; two of them died young.  His two sons were both active in the United States military.  One of his sons, Marine Corps First Lieutenant John Brooks, Jr., was killed in action at the Battle of Lake Erie in 1813.  His other son, Alexander Scammel Brooks, was a lieutenant colonel in the Army and was killed in a steamboat explosion in Florida in 1836. Through Alexander, his great-grandson was Edward L. Keyes.

The Maine towns of Brooks, established in 1816, and Brooksville, founded in 1817, were named for him.

Notes

Sources

External links 
 The Society of the Cincinnati
 The American Revolution Institute

Governors of Massachusetts
Continental Army officers from Massachusetts
People from Massachusetts in the War of 1812
American militiamen in the War of 1812
American Unitarians
1752 births
1825 deaths
Massachusetts Federalists
Federalist Party state governors of the United States
Adjutants General of Massachusetts
Politicians from Medford, Massachusetts
People of colonial Massachusetts
Burials in Massachusetts